The Hickories is a historic home located at Cazenovia in Madison County, New York.  It was built in 1897 and is a large summer home built in a combined Shingle Style and Georgian Revival style.  It is a roughly rectangular, two-story residence that was built as a summer home for Reverend Townsend Glover Jackson, a Cazenovia minister.  It features a central two-story, pedimented projecting portico with paired Ionic order columns.  Also on the property is a boathouse.

It was added to the National Register of Historic Places in 1991.

References

Houses on the National Register of Historic Places in New York (state)
Colonial Revival architecture in New York (state)
Houses completed in 1897
Shingle Style houses
Houses in Madison County, New York
National Register of Historic Places in Cazenovia, New York
Shingle Style architecture in New York (state)